Honours degree has various meanings in the context of different degrees and education systems. Most commonly it refers to a variant of the undergraduate bachelor's degree containing a larger volume of material or a higher standard of study, or both, rather than an "ordinary", "general" or "pass" bachelor's degree. Honours degrees are sometimes indicated by "Hons" after the degree abbreviation, with various punctuation according to local custom, e.g. "BA (Hons)", "B.A., Hons", etc. In Canada, honours degrees may be indicated with an "H" preceding the degree abbreviation, e.g. "HBA" for Honours Bachelor of Arts or Honours Business Administration.

Examples of honours degree include the honors bachelor's degree in the United States; the bachelor's degree with honours in the United Kingdom, the Netherlands, Bangladesh, Hong Kong, and India; the honours bachelor's degree in Ireland; the bachelor with honours and bachelor honours degree in New Zealand; the bachelor with honours and honours bachelor's degree in Canada; and the bachelor honours degree in Australia. In South Africa the bachelor honours degree is a postgraduate degree that follows on from the completion of a bachelor's degree. The undergraduate master of arts degree awarded by the ancient universities of Scotland in place of the bachelor of arts may be awarded as an honours or non-honours degree; these are at the same level as equivalent bachelor's degrees. At master's level, the integrated master's degrees in British universities, which students enter at the same level as bachelor's degrees, are also honours degrees.

Many universities and colleges offer both honours and non-honours bachelor's degrees. In most countries where honours degrees are granted, they imply a higher level of achievement than a non-honours degree. In some countries (e.g. Australia), an honours degree may also involve a longer period of study than a non-honours degree. Students who complete all the requirements for a non-honours bachelor's degree but do not receive sufficient merit to be awarded an honours degree would normally be awarded a non-honours degree  (sometimes known as a "pass", "general" or "ordinary" degree), although students who do not complete the requirements for an integrated master's honours degree may receive a bachelor's honours degree. In England, Northern Ireland and Wales, almost all bachelor's degrees are awarded as honours degrees; in contrast, honours degrees are rarely awarded in the United States.

The current British undergraduate degree classification system, with its division into first, upper and lower second, and third class honours, was developed in 1918 to distinguish between students on the basis of their academic achievement. The concept of an "honours" degree goes back much further than this, however, as there were examinations for honours in the original regulations of the University of London in 1839, and Nevil Maskelyne being recorded as taking a bachelor's degree with honours at Cambridge in 1754. Other countries influenced by this system include Australia, Brunei, Canada, New Zealand, Malta, Singapore, South Africa, The Netherlands and Hong Kong.

Australia
The consecutive Australian with-honours degree is usually a one to two-year research program, after the completion of a bachelor's degree in the same field. It can also be started as a concurrent program in the fourth year of a four-year bachelor's degree. It is generally considered a postgraduate year because a bachelor's degree can be completed without it.   Entry to an honours degree generally requires proven abilities and a distinction (75% or greater average) in the relevant area or the final-year units, and even then is quite competitive.

In the regular (standalone) honours, the student will complete selected courses within a supervised program of research (field, laboratory, or secondary), and produce a long, high-quality research thesis. This is usually accompanied by a seminar or presentation of the findings to an academic board for marking. In the case of a quality thesis being produced, its findings may be published in a peer-reviewed academic journal or similar publication. Students receiving high marks in their honours program have the option of continuing to candidature of a doctoral program, such as Doctor of Philosophy, without having to complete a master's degree.  Honours can be awarded at up to five levels, depending on the awarding institution, and may be indicated in post-nominals in general as "(Hons)":
 Honours, Class 1, with a University Medal, sometimes indicated in post-nominals as (Hons IM), (Hons 1M), or (H1M) 
 Honours, Class 1, sometimes indicated in post-nominals as (Hons I), (Hons 1), or (H1)
 Honours, Class 2, Division 1 (or Division A), sometimes indicated in post-nominals as (Hons II), (Hons II(1)), (Hons 2(1)), (H21), (Hons IIA), (Hons 2A), or (H2A) 
 Honours, Class 2, Division 2 (or Division B), sometimes indicated in post-nominals as (Hons II), (Hons II(2)), (Hons 2(2)), (H22), (Hons IIB), (Hons 2B), or (H2B) 
 Honours, Class 3, sometimes indicated in post-nominals as (Hons III), (Hons 3), or (H3)

At the master's level, Monash University has a Master of Business with Honours program in which students can be awarded an honours classification upon completion.

Macquarie University has phased out the honours degree in favour of the Master of Research degree for most fields, although it still offers honours degrees in psychology and engineering as honours degrees are required for accreditation in these fields.

Canada
In Canada there are two type of honours degree. Some universities, especially in Ontario, award an honours degree after four years of undergraduate study, instead of the three years of an ordinary bachelor's degree. Examples of universities awarding this degree include Queen's University and York University. In those universities, honours degree students may undertake an honours thesis.

Some other universities, such as McGill University, University of Ottawa, University of Western Ontario, University of British Columbia, Concordia University and Dalhousie University, require students to undertake an honours project in order to graduate with honours (Latin cum honore, French spécialisé). In those universities, honours programmes also require a higher degree of specialization than non-honours "major" degrees, including a supervised research project or thesis, and students are required to maintain a high academic standard.

Thesis-based honours degrees prepare students for research-based postgraduate study, and may sometimes allow direct entry into doctoral programs. A four-year bachelor's degree is required for entry to most postgraduate courses in Canada.

England, Wales and Northern Ireland
In England, Wales and Northern Ireland, bachelor's degrees are normally awarded "with honours" after three years of study. The bachelor's degree with honours meets the requirements for a higher education qualification at level 6 of the Framework for Higher Education Qualifications in full, and is a first-cycle, end-of-cycle award on the Qualifications Framework of the European Higher Education Area established by the Bologna process.
Students can be awarded an "ordinary" degree if they achieve the required learning outcomes over a smaller volume of studies than is required for an honours degree, e.g. only passing 300 credits rather than the 360 usually required for an honours degree. In addition to bachelor's degrees, four-year integrated master's degrees, which combine study at the bachelor's and master's levels, are also awarded with honours.

The University of Oxford does not award honours with its standard BA degree, but considers students who gain a third class degree or better to have "achieved honours status".

Hong Kong
Universities in Hong Kong have four degree classifications: first class, second class upper division (or second class division one/I), second class lower division (or second class division two/II), and third class. Bachelor's degrees issued in Hong Kong are honour degrees and are abbreviated as BSc (Hons), BEng (Hons), BBA (Hons), etc. The University of Hong Kong, Hong Kong University of Science and Technology, and the Hong Kong Polytechnic University follow a GPA scale of 4.3, and The Chinese University of Hong Kong follows a GPA scale of 4.0.

Malta
A number of honours degrees are offered by the University of Malta, and the Malta College of Arts, Science and Technology (MCAST), usually indicating an extra year of study with an undergraduate dissertation or a specialisation within a three-year programme.

Netherlands
In the Netherlands, the Honours programme is an addition of 30 ECTS to the regular Bachelor's programme, and must be completed within 2 to 3 years of undergraduate studies. In most universities, this programme offers an interdisciplinary approach, blending teachings from social and medical sciences, as well as knowledge from the fields of business and economics, art and law to all honours students. To gain access to this programme, prospective students must demonstrate outstanding academic performance, and average a GPA of minimum 7.5/10 at the end of their studies to graduate with Honours.

New Zealand
The bachelor honours degree is a separate level on the New Zealand Qualifications Framework from the bachelor's degree without honours, as in Australia and Scotland. It may either be a 4-year (480 credit) course or a single-year (120 credit) course following on from a bachelor's degree, and it prepares students for postgraduate study. Bachelor's degrees issued are abbreviated as B.Com. (Hons), B.Sc. (Hons), etc. The award of honours recognises outstanding achievement, meritorious achievement or a pass; these may be termed first class honours, second class honours: first or second divisions, and third class honours.

Scotland
In Scotland, all undergraduate degrees with honours must be of four-year duration. Students can choose to do the honours degree or the general (or pass/ordinary) degree. The first two years of both types of degrees are the same; however, after that, students who pursue the honours route will complete more advanced subjects and a dissertation in their last year, while students who choose to do the general degree will complete their third year at a lower level of specialisation.

Entry into the honours year in Scotland is generally not restricted and students are encouraged to take the honours year as the general/ordinary/pass degree does not provide the same level of depth and specialisation.

Students enrolling in the honours program but failing to achieve the required academic merit for honours are awarded a pass/ordinary/general degree.

Ireland
In Ireland, honours bachelor's degrees are at level 8 of the National Framework of Qualifications and are Bologna first cycle degrees. They normally follow a three or four year (180-240 ECTS credits) course. The higher diploma may be awarded at the same level following a single year of study (60 ECTS credits) and is normally taken following an honours degree as a conversion course. Ordinary (non-honours) bachelor's degrees are at level 7 of the framework and take three years (180 EFTS credits) to complete.

South Africa
In South Africa, non-professional bachelor's degrees (BA, BSc, BCom) are three-year degrees (professional degrees such as law or medicine are longer). Students with a 3-year degree may register for  honours degree, a one-year qualification required to register for a Master's. Usually the honours degree specialises in one subject matter (e.g., mathematics, English). Intake into the honours degree is often highly selective. The bachelor's degree is at level 7 and the honours degree at level 8 on the National Qualifications Framework of the South African Qualifications Authority. The honours degree typically consists of taught courses and research components (at least 25% of the honours degree).

United States
In the United States, many honours degrees (or honors degrees in US spelling) require a thesis or project work beyond that needed for the normal bachelor's program. Honours programs in the US are taken alongside the rest of the degree and often have a minimum GPA requirement for entry or college-entrance exam score, which can vary between institutions. In rare cases, a student may petition to write one even if they do not meet the normal requirements. Some institutions do not have a separate honours program, but instead refer to bachelor's degrees awarded with Latin honours, which may be based either on GPA or class position, as honours degrees.

See also
Bachelor's degree
Master's degree
Doctorate
Doctor of Philosophy (PhD)

References

Academic degrees